The Treaty of Amiens was signed on 23 May 1279 in Amiens, Picardy between the King of France, Philip III, and the King of England, Edward I, to settle their disputes.

Historical background 
The 1229 Treaty of Paris put an end to the conflict between the King of France, Louis IX, and the Count of Toulouse, Raymond VII, and provided for the marriage of the latter's daughter, Joan of Toulouse, to King Louis' brother, Alphonse of Poitiers. In the event that they did not have heirs, their estates were to revert to the Crown of France. Among these estates, some, such as Agenais and Quercy, were originally part of the dowry that Joan of England, sister of King Richard I of England, brought when she married count Raymond VI of Toulouse in October 1196.

The 1259 Treaty of Paris signed between King Louis IX and Henry III, King of England, had provided that, in the event that Joan of Toulouse did not have an heir, the estates brought by her grandmother, Joan of England, would return to the English Crown. Henry III had also raised claims to Quercy and Saintonge, but they had not been settled.

In August 1271 Joan of Toulouse and Alphonse of Poitiers died a few days apart, without an heir. As soon as their deaths were known, the King of France, Philip III, declared himself the owner of all their domains, including those which were supposed to go to King Henry III.

Principal clauses 
After the death of Henry III, negotiations between Philip III and Edward I continued for some time before reaching an agreement:
 By this treaty, King Philip III of France re-confirmed the clauses of the 1259 treaty of Paris. 
 Philip III ceded the Agenais to the King of England and renounced the possession of Saintonge. 
 The English claim to Quercy was left open for future negotiations.

Consequences 
The lords of Agenais took an oath of loyalty to the King of England on April 9, 1279, in the church of the Jacobins in Agen.

In 1286 Quercy finally returned to the King of France, Philip IV, in exchange for an annuity the French paid to the King of England.

Bibliography 
 JF Boudon de Saint-Amans, Histoire ancienne et moderne du département de Lot-et-Garonne, 1836.
 Gérard Sivéry, Philippe III le Hardi, Fayard, 2003.

1279 in England
Amiens (1279)
1270s in France
13th century in England
Amiens
Amiens (1279)
Edward I of England
13th-century military history of France
History of Aquitaine